Quitsna is an unincorporated community in southern Bertie County, North Carolina, United States, in the coastal plain, approximately  from Washington, D.C. It is located on Quitsna Road, and Indian Woods Road, west of Grabtown. Indian Woods Baptist Church is located in Quitsna.

Unincorporated communities in Bertie County, North Carolina
Unincorporated communities in North Carolina